The 2011 CAF Confederation Cup Final was the final of 2011 CAF Confederation Cup, which was the 8th edition of the CAF Confederation Cup, Africa's secondary club football competition organized by the Confederation of African Football (CAF).

The final was played between Club Africain from Tunisia and Maghreb de Fès from Morocco. The winners qualified to participate in the 2012 CAF Super Cup against the winner of the 2011 CAF Champions League.

Road to final

Rules
The final was decided over two legs, with aggregate goals used to determine the winner. If the sides were level on aggregate after the second leg, the away goals rule would have been applied, and if still level, the tie would have proceeded directly to a penalty shootout (no extra time is played).

Match details

First Leg

Second Leg

References

External links
CAF Confederation Cup

Final
2011
Club Africain matches
MAS Fez matches
Sports competitions in Radès
21st century in Radès